Arachnomura is a genus of South American jumping spiders that was first described by Cândido Firmino de Mello-Leitão in 1917.  it contains only two species, found only in Argentina and Brazil: A. hieroglyphica and A. querandi.

References

Salticidae genera
Salticidae
Spiders of Argentina
Spiders of Brazil
Taxa named by Cândido Firmino de Mello-Leitão